Aranyaprathet railway station is a railway station located in Aranyaprathet Subdistrict, Aranyaprathet District, Sa Kaeo, Thailand.

There is a rail connection service to the Cambodian border city of Poipet. First opened in 1955, this service has seen closures between 1961–1970 and 1974–2019 due to neglect and poor diplomatic relations, but is back in operation as of April 2019. Later, it was closed again due to the COVID-19 pandemic.

Cross Border Rail Link
Ban Klong Luc Station is situated 6 km east of Aranyaprathet station and 1km to the west of the temporary Cambodian Railway terminus at Poipet station. The currently disused 7km rail link crosses the border bridge immediately east of the Thai station. The railway then crosses the national highway to the south side via a roundabout before entering the Cambodian station.

Train services 

Ordinary train No. 275/276 Bangkok–Aranyaprathet–Ban Klong Luk Border
Ordinary train No. 279/280 Ban Klong Luk Border–Aranyaprathet–Bangkok

References 
 
 
 
 

Railway stations in Thailand
Railway stations opened in 1926